Rubidograptis praeconia is a species of moth of the family Tortricidae. It is found in the Democratic Republic of the Congo.

The larvae have been recorded feeding on Stictococcus species.

References

Moths described in 1937
Tortricini
Endemic fauna of the Democratic Republic of the Congo